Dhaliwal is a clan of Jat people from the Punjab region of India and Pakistan.

Notable people with this surname, not necessarily connected to the clan, include:
 Daljit Dhaliwal (born 1962), British television presenter 
 Herb Dhaliwal (born 1952), Canadian politician
 Jagwinder Dhaliwal (born 1981), British singer
 Naina Dhaliwal (born 1984), Indian model
 Nirpal Singh Dhaliwal (born 1974), British journalist and novelist
 Ranj Dhaliwal (born 1976), Canadian author
 Sarindar Dhaliwal (born 1953), Canadian artist
 Sohraab Dhaliwal (born 1991), Indian cricketer
 Sukh Dhaliwal (born 1960), Canadian businessman and politician
 Sukhdarshan Dhaliwal (born 1950), Punjabi–American poet
 Vicky Dhaliwal (born 1988), Punjabi lyricist
 Jagmeet Singh Dhaliwal, Canadian politician

See also 
Dhaliwal (disambiguation)

References

Dhaliwal
Jat clans
Dhaliwal
Dhaliwal
Punjabi-language surnames